Arcuavena is a genus of flies in the family Stratiomyidae.

Species
Arcuavena barbiellinii (Bezzi, 1908)
Arcuavena bezzii (Lindner, 1949)
Arcuavena limbata (Bigot, 1879)
Arcuavena limbativentris (Enderlein, 1921)
Arcuavena nigerrima (Lindner, 1949)
Arcuavena singularis (Macquart, 1846)

References

Stratiomyidae
Brachycera genera
Diptera of South America